Ricardo Alexandre Almeida Santos (born 18 June 1995) is a Portuguese professional footballer who plays as a defender and is the captain for Bolton Wanderers.

Career
Santos was a youth team player at Dagenham & Redbridge, making one appearance in the matchday squad, before he was released and signed by Thurrock manager Mark Stimson, following a spell at Dover Athletic where he made no appearances. He impressed for the Isthmian League club, making 24 appearances, and was signed by Peterborough United manager Darren Ferguson on three-and-a-half-year contract in February 2014. Peterborough paid £8000 for him. He made his League One debut on 3 May in a 0–0 draw with Port Vale at London Road. Santos scored his first goal for the club when he scored a late winner against Doncaster Rovers on 19 March 2016.

On 1 January 2017, Santos joined Barnet for a fee of £100,000. He made his debut on the following day in a 1-0 win over Plymouth Argyle. He left the club at the end of the 2019-20 season having spent two-and-a-half seasons with the Bees, making 94 appearances, scoring six goals.

Bolton Wanderers
Santos signed for Bolton Wanderers on a two-year deal on 3 August 2020. His debut came on 5 September in Bolton's first match of the season, a 1–2 home defeat against Bradford in the first round of the EFL Cup. On 1 March 2021, Santos signed a new contract with Bolton until 2023. He was named as EFL League Two Player of the Month for February 2021. On 21 May 2021, following the team's direct promotion to the EFL League One, he was announced to have been voted as Bolton Wanderers' Player of the Year for the 2020–21 season. Plus, he was named in the league's Team of the Year, together with his team-mate Eoin Doyle.

On 22 October 2021, following the sudden departure of Antoni Sarcevic to Stockport County, Santos was appointed by manager Ian Evatt as Bolton's new captain. On 26 May 2022, Santos signed a new three year deal with Bolton Wanderers which would keep him at the club until 2025.

On 11 February 2023, Santos scored his first goals for Bolton with a brace in a 5-0 win at his former team Peterborough United, Boltons 5000th league game.

Career statistics

Notes

Honours
Bolton Wanderers
EFL League Two third-place (promotion): 2020–21

Individual
EFL League Two Player of the Month: February 2021
PFA Team of the Year: 2020–21 League Two
PFA Team of the Year: 2021–22 League One
Bolton Wanderers Player of the Year: 2020–21

References

External links

1995 births
Living people
Sportspeople from Almada
Portuguese footballers
Portuguese sportspeople of Angolan descent
Portuguese expatriate footballers
Portuguese expatriate sportspeople in England
Association football defenders
Dagenham & Redbridge F.C. players
Billericay Town F.C. players
Dover Athletic F.C. players
Thurrock F.C. players
Peterborough United F.C. players
Barnet F.C. players
Bolton Wanderers F.C. players
Isthmian League players
National League (English football) players
English Football League players